Jana Radosavljević (born 4 November 1996) is a footballer who plays as a midfielder for Arminia Bielefeld. Born in Serbia, she represents the New Zealand women's national team.

Club career
Radosavljević has played her entire professional career in Germany, having signed for BV Cloppenburg ahead of the 2017–18 season, scoring on her debut. She played 3 seasons for BC Cloppenburg scoring 14 goals. Ahead of the 2020–21 season, Radosavljević moved to Werder Bremen team to play in the Frauen-Bundesliga. Radosavljevic signed with Arminia Bielefeld. ahead of the 2021–22 season.

International career
Radosavljević made her international debut for the New Zealand national team on 7 November 2019, appearing in the 2–0 loss against China in the 2019 Yongchuan International Tournament. She made her second appearance three days later against Canada. Her third appearance she made at the 7 March 2020 at the 2020 Algarve Cup in the 3–0 loss against Italy.

Personal life
Radosavljević was born in Aleksinac the Republic of Serbia, FR Yugoslavia to Serbian parents Aleksandra and Ivica Radosavljević, but moved to New Zealand, where her aunt lived, after the Yugoslav Wars. She attended Waterloo School in Waterloo, Lower Hutt for five years before returning to Serbia with her parents in February 2006. Radosavljević is fluent in the Serbian, English and German languages.

Career statistics

Club

International

References

External links
 
 

1996 births
Living people
People from Aleksinac
Serbian emigrants to New Zealand
Naturalised citizens of New Zealand
Serbian women's footballers
New Zealand women's association footballers
Women's association football midfielders
Frauen-Bundesliga players
2. Frauen-Bundesliga players
BV Cloppenburg (women) players
SV Werder Bremen (women) players
New Zealand women's international footballers
Serbian expatriate women's footballers
New Zealand expatriate women's association footballers
Serbian expatriate sportspeople in Germany
New Zealand expatriate sportspeople in Germany
Expatriate women's footballers in Germany
New Zealand people of Serbian descent